Viam agnoscere veritatis is the name of a letter written by Pope Innocent IV to the Mongols.  It was written on November 22, 1248, and was Pope Innocent's reply to a message from Mongol commander Baiju. Innocent IV had previously sent two letters to the Mongols in 1245, Cum non solum and Dei patris immensa.

The letter was probably transmitted from the Pope via Mongol envoys Aïbeg and Serkis, was dated November 22, 1248, and was the Pope's reply to a letter from Baiju. Some historians refer to it as "Viam agnoscere veritatis" and some as "Viam cognoscere veritatis" (both "agnoscere" and "cognoscere" are Latin for "to know").  According to historian Denis Sinor, the letter "stated that Innocent IV had acted out of a sense of duty to let the true religion be known to the Mongols, and that he regretted the Mongols' perseverance in their errors and adjured them to cease their menaces."

Notes

References
 Grousset, René, Histoire des Croisades, III, Tempus, 2006 edition, 

 Rachewiltz, I, Papal Envoys to the Great Khans, Stanford University Press, 1971.
 Roux, Jean-Paul, Histoire de l'Empire Mongol, 1993, Fayard, 
 Runciman, Steven, History of the Crusades, III, Penguin Books, 2002 edition, 
 Kenneth Meyer Setton,  "A History of the Crusades"

1248 works
Documents of Pope Innocent IV
Letters (message)